Remlingen may refer to the following places in Germany:

Remlingen, Lower Saxony, in the district of Wolfenbüttel, Lower Saxony
Remlingen, Bavaria, in the district of Würzburg, Bavaria